Dietrich VI (also known as Dietrich of Meissen), was Count of Cleves from 1260 through 1275. He was born in 1226 as the son of Dietrich V, Count of Cleves and Hedwig of Meissen.

The County of Cleves was a comital polity of the Holy Roman Empire in present Germany (part of North Rhine-Westphalia) and the Netherlands (parts of Limburg, North Brabant and Gelderland). Its rulers, called counts, had a special and privileged standing in the Empire. The County of Cleves was first mentioned in the 11th century. In 1417, the county became a duchy and its rulers were raised to the status of Dukes.

Its history is closely related to that of its neighbours: the Duchies of Jülich, Berg and Guelders and the County of Mark. In 1368, Cleves and Mark were united. In 1521 Jülich, Berg, Cleves and Mark formed the United Duchies of Jülich-Cleves-Berg.  The territory was situated on both sides of the river Rhine, around its capital Cleves and roughly covering today's districts of Cleves, Wesel and the city of Duisburg.

Marriage and Issue 

Dietrich VI married Alida of Heinsberg (d. 1303), daughter of Henry I of Sponheim and Agnes of Heinsberg. Their children were:

 Dietrich VII, Count of Cleves (b. 1256 - d. 4 Oct 1305)
 Dietrich von Kleve, Prior of Xanten (b. 1258)
 Mechtild von Kleve (b. 1260 - d. 21 Dec 1309), married Henry I, Landgrave of Hesse
 Dietrich Luf II von Kleve, Count of Hülchrath (b. 1262)
 Agnes von Kleve (b. 1264 - d. 1312)
 Irmgard von Kleve, (b. 1266 - d. 11 May 1319)

Counts of Cleves
1226 births
1275 deaths